The Presidential Medal of Freedom is the highest civilian award of the United States, along with the Congressional Gold Medal. It is an award bestowed by the president of the United States to recognize people who have made "an especially meritorious contribution to the security or national interests of the United States, world peace, cultural or other significant public or private endeavors." The award is not limited to U.S. citizens and, while it is a civilian award, it can also be awarded to military personnel and worn on the uniform.
It was established in 1963 by President John F. Kennedy, superseding the Medal of Freedom that was established by President Harry S. Truman in 1945 to honor civilian service during World War II.

There are no specific criteria for receiving the award with distinction;  simply specifies that the award should come in two degrees, and hence any decision to award the higher degree is entirely at the discretion of the president.

In 2017, President Barack Obama stated receiving the award with distinction indicates "an additional level of veneration"  in a class of individuals already held in the highest esteem. , 26 people have been awarded the medal with distinction, amounting to approximately 4% of all awards.

The Presidential Medal of Freedom is the supreme civilian decoration in the United States, whereas its predecessor, the Medal of Freedom, was inferior in precedence to the Medal for Merit; the Medal of Freedom was awarded by any of three Cabinet secretaries, whereas the Medal for Merit was awarded by the president, as is the Presidential Medal of Freedom.

Overview
President John F. Kennedy established the presidential version of the decoration in 1963 through , with unique and distinctive insignia, vastly expanded purpose, and far higher prestige. It was the first U.S. civilian neck decoration and, if awarded with Distinction, is the only U.S. sash and star decoration (the Chief Commander degree of the Legion of Merit—which may only be awarded to foreign heads of state—is a star decoration but without a sash). The executive order calls for the medal to be awarded annually on or around July 4, and at other convenient times as chosen by the president, but it has not been awarded every year (e.g., 2001, 2010). Recipients are selected by the president, either on the president's own initiative or based on recommendations. The order establishing the medal also expanded the size and the responsibilities of the Distinguished Civilian Service Awards Board so it could serve as a major source of such recommendations.

The medal may be awarded to an individual more than once; Colin Powell received two awards, his second being with Distinction; Ellsworth Bunker received both of his awards with Distinction. It may also be awarded posthumously; examples include John F. Kennedy, Pope John XXIII, Lyndon Johnson, John Wayne, Paul "Bear" Bryant, Thurgood Marshall, Cesar Chavez, Walter Reuther, Roberto Clemente, Jack Kemp, Harvey Milk, James Chaney, Andrew Goodman, Michael Schwerner, Elouise Cobell, Grace Hopper, Antonin Scalia, Elvis Presley and Babe Ruth. (Chaney, Goodman and Schwerner, civil rights workers murdered in 1964, were awarded their medals in 2014, 50 years later.)

The first recipient of the award was Anna M. Rosenberg, wartime presidential advisor, who received the award on October 29, 1945. Athlete and activist Simone Biles is the youngest person to receive this award at the age of 25.

Insignia
 
The badge of the Presidential Medal of Freedom is in the form of a golden star with white enamel, with a red enamel pentagon behind it; the central disc bears thirteen gold stars on a blue enamel background (taken from the Great Seal of the United States) within a golden ring. Golden bald eagles with spread wings stand between the points of the star. It is worn around the neck on a blue ribbon having white edge stripes. Women may choose to receive the award as a bow worn on the left chest (as for Margaret Thatcher).

A special and rarely granted award, called the Presidential Medal of Freedom with Distinction, has a larger version of the same badge, which is worn as a star on the left chest. It comes with a sash that is worn over the right shoulder (similarly to the Grand Cross of an order of chivalry), with its rosette (blue with a white edge, bearing the central disc of the badge at its center) resting on the left hip. When the medal with Distinction is awarded, the star may be presented hanging from a neck ribbon and can be identified by its size, which is larger than the standard badge.

In addition to the full-size insignia, the award is accompanied by a service ribbon for wear on military service uniform, a miniature medal pendant for wear on mess dress or civilian formal wear, and a lapel badge for wear on civilian clothes, all of which comes in the full presentation set. There is a silver bald eagle with spread wings on the miniature and service ribbon, or a golden bald eagle for a medal awarded with Distinction.

The Insignia was designed by the Army's Institute of Heraldry, led by Col. Harry Downing Temple.

Revocation
There is currently no process for the award to be  revoked. This issue has been raised regarding certain recipients, in particular regarding the award given to actor and comedian Bill Cosby.

Recipients

Gallery

See also
 Awards and decorations of the United States government
 Awards and decorations of the United States military

References

External links

 "Presidential Medal of Freedom", an article (undated) from jfklibrary.org, the John F. Kennedy Presidential Library and Museum's official website. Accessed August 22, 2009.
 "Presidential Medal of Freedom Recipients", a list of recipients from May 5, 1993, through August 19, 2009, from senate.gov, the U.S. Senate's official website. Accessed August 22, 2009.
 "President Bush Honors Medal of Freedom Recipients", a news release from the White House Press Secretary, December 15, 2006, containing a transcript of President George W. Bush's opening remarks at the December 15, 2006, presentation (with link to individual citations). Hosted on georgewbush-whitehouse.archives.gov, a section of the U.S. National Archives and Records Administration's official website. Accessed August 22, 2009.
 "Medal of Freedom Ceremony" (August 12, 2009), a news release, August 12, 2009, from the White House Press Secretary at whitehouse.gov, the White House's official website. Accessed August 22, 2009.
 Sanger, David E., "War Figures Honored With Medal of Freedom", The New York Times, December 15, 2004.

 
Awards established in 1960
Civil awards and decorations of the United States
Presidency of the United States
Presidency of John F. Kennedy